Kiss or Kill may refer to:

Kiss or Kill (1997 film), an Australian film directed by Bill Bennett
Kiss or Kill (album), an album by Endeverafter
Kiss or Kill (1918 film), a silent film